The 1896 Dickinson football team was an American football team that represented Dickinson College as an independent during the 1896 college football season. The team compiled a 4–5 record and outscored opponents by a total of 130 to 90. Nathan Stauffer was the team's head coach.

Schedule

References

Dickinson
Dickinson Red Devils football seasons
Dickinson football